Play to the Whistle is a British sports comedy panel game show that aired on ITV from 11 April 2015 to 4 April 2017. In each episode two teams of three competed in sports knowledge rounds and physical games to achieve points for their teams, at the end the team with the most points was declared the winner.

The show was hosted by Holly Willoughby and Bradley Walsh. One team was captained by entertainer, actor and presenter Bradley Walsh and the other team by former professional footballer Frank Lampard. Lampard was joined by comedian Romesh Ranganathan as a regular panellist. Seann Walsh, also a comedian, was the resident scorer. Former professional footballer Jimmy Bullard was the host's assistant in the first series.

Production
The show was commissioned as part of ITV's endeavour to find a panel show for their flagship channel after other pilot series had aired. The show was made by Hungry Bear Media and the executive producer was Dan Baldwin, Holly Willoughby's husband. Despite the sport theme, ITV said that they were not targeting sports fans specifically but producing the show for the whole family audience. Baldwin stated that the host's lack of sports knowledge would help viewers in the same position. Filming of each episode took place at the Fountain Studios in Wembley in front of a live studio audience. The first two episodes of the first series were recorded on 31 March 2015, the next two on 20 April, one on 27 April and the final two on 3 May. It was revealed in November 2015 that ITV had ordered a second series. Episodes for this series were recorded on 8 January, 15 January and 17 January 2016 with 2 episodes being recorded each day. Willoughby promoted the third and final series as a guest on The One Show on 27/02/17.

The show's title came from the phrase used in football; the idea that players should continue with the game, even if they believe play should be stopped for any reason, until the referee has blown his whistle to halt play. In the show Willoughby blew her whistle to conclude the rounds.

Transmissions

References

External links

2010s British comedy television series
2010s British game shows
2015 British television series debuts
2017 British television series endings
English-language television shows
ITV comedy
ITV panel games
Television series by Hungry Bear Media
Television shows shot at BBC Elstree Centre